Penelope Ann Rachel, Lady Reed (born Penelope Anne Rachel Dudley Ward; 4 August 1914 – 21 January 1982), known as Penelope Dudley-Ward, was an English actress.

Born in London, she was the elder daughter of William Dudley Ward and the leading socialite Freda Dudley Ward, her mother being best remembered for being the long-time mistress of the Prince of Wales, the future King Edward VIII. She was a leading lady in several British films during the 1930s and 1940s. She retired from the screen following her second marriage.

Her first marriage, to Anthony Pelissier, lasted from 29 December 1939, until their divorce in 1944; the couple had one daughter, the actress Tracy Reed. Dudley-Ward married film director Carol Reed on 24 January 1948. They had one son, Max Reed, born 14 September 1948. Dudley-Ward and Reed remained married until he died in 1976.

Death
Lady Reed died from a brain tumour on 21 January 1982 at the age of 67, fourteen months before her mother.

Filmography

See also

List of notable brain tumor patients

References

External links

1914 births
1982 deaths
Actresses from London
Deaths from brain cancer in England
English film actresses
Penelope
20th-century English actresses
Birkin family
Wives of knights